Muhamed Kesra Hakeem (born 25 October 1996) is a Sudanese footballer who plays as a centre-back for Al-Merrikh SC and the Sudan national team.

References

1996 births
Living people
Sudanese footballers
Sudan international footballers
Association football central defenders
Al Khartoum SC players
Hay Al-Arab SC players
2021 Africa Cup of Nations players